Carlos Antonio Torres Garay (born 25 June 1966) is a Peruvian former footballer who played as a midfielder. He made five appearances for the Peru national team in 1989. He was also part of Peru's squad for the 1989 Copa América tournament.

References

External links
 
 

Living people
1966 births
Footballers from Lima
Peruvian footballers
Association football midfielders
Peru international footballers
Sport Boys footballers
Sporting Cristal footballers
Juan Aurich footballers
Alianza Atlético footballers